Ramón Gómez de la Serna y Puig (Born July 3, 1888 in Madrid – Died January 13, 1963 in Buenos Aires) was a Spanish writer, dramatist and avant-garde agitator. He strongly influenced surrealist film maker Luis Buñuel.

Ramón Gómez de la Serna was especially known for "Greguería", a short form of poetry that roughly corresponds to the one-liner in comedy.  The Gregueria is especially able to grant a new and often humorous perspective. Serna published over 90 works in all literary genres. In 1933, he was invited to Buenos Aires. He stayed there during the Spanish Civil War and the following Spanish State and died there.

Biography
Born into an upper-middle-class family, Gómez de la Serna refused to follow his father into law or politics and soon adopted the marginal lifestyle of a bohemian bourgeois artist, writing for the journal Prometeo, funded by his father between 1908 and 1912. In April 1909 Gómez de la Serna published the manifesto of futurism in the magazine which was translated by him into Spanish.

During the First World War, Gómez became Spain's chief exponent of avant-garde writing, establishing a base in the literary tertulia he founded at the centre of Madrid.

This was Spain's most famous contribution to what Roger Shattuck has called "the banquet years". But behind the self-publicizing avant-garde antics, Gómez developed not only an extravagant public persona, but also his own equivalent of what Shattuck defines as a "reversal of consciousness",  deliberately divesting himself of conventional ways of thinking and being in order to adopt a peculiarly innovative way of looking at the world, one which influenced the younger 1927 generation of poets (as Luis Cernuda has explained).

The six or so remarkable books he published from 1914 to 1918 – El Rastro (The Flea-Market), El Doctor Inverosímil (The Improbable Doctor), Greguerías (Greguerias), Senos (Breasts), Pombo (Pombo), and El circo (The Circus) – illustrate most of his main characteristics: his search for a new fragmentary genre of short prose poems (giving them the arbitrary name of greguerías), his exaltation of trivial everyday objects, his emphasis on eroticism, his exuberant self-projection and exclusive dedication to art, his playful humour, his contemplative secular mysticism, and above all his cult of the image, especially witty surprising images.

These abound in all his works, especially his many, utterly idiosyncratic and textually pleasurable novels, such as the first real one La viuda blanca y negra (The Black and White Widow), written in 1921, inspired by his relationship with the early feminist writer, Carmen de Burgos.

It was in fact the greguerías that first attracted the attention of Valery Larbaud, who in the 1920s soon had him translated into French.

Within Spain, though his work often provoked controversy and sometimes hostility, one of his most eminent defenders was José Ortega y Gasset. Subsequently, unorganized consensus in mainstream Hispanism deemed Gómez's work to have been overrated.

Gómez's lack of commitment during the Republic, followed by his declaration of support for Franco after self-exile to his younger, Jewish wife's flat in Buenos Aires at the outbreak of civil war, led to ostracism and neglect.

Despite still producing some of the most original works in Spanish of the twentieth century – the existential-surrealist novel El hombre perdido (The Lost Man) (1947) and his autobiography Automoribundia (Automoribund) [1948] – his life in exile was one of pathetic isolation and increasing poverty, neither of which were helped by the knowledge that he had left behind (and in 1947 donated to the Spanish State) the painting of the Pombo Tertulia by Gutiérrez-Solana (now given pride of place in Madrid's Reina Sofia Museum), in addition to the cubist portrait of him painted in 1915 by Diego Rivera (which was lost during the civil war, but has apparently resurfaced). On 13 January 1963 Gómez died from natural causes. In a letter to one of his companions, he mentions acknowledging his imminent death and welcomed it.

Despite the decline in Gómez's reputation, two notable voices in particular declared their admiration: Octavio Paz, who wrote the following in a letter to Papeles de Son Armadans in 1967: 'Para mí es el gran escritor español: el Escritor o, mejor, la Escritura. Comparto la admiración, el fanatismo, de Larbaud: yo también habría aprendido el español sólo para leerlo’ (For me he is the great Spanish writer: the Writer, or rather, Writing. I share Larbaud’s admiration, his fanaticism: I also would have learned Spanish just to read him), and Pablo Neruda, who in his prologue to Ramón's Obras selectas (Selected Works) (1971) claimed that 'la gran figura del surrealismo, entre todos los países, ha sido Ramón' (the major figure of surrealism, in any country, has been Ramón).

His works have been published in 20 volumes by Círculo de Lectores/Galaxia Gutenberg (Barcelona), edited by Ioana Zlotescu.

Works
El circo
Translations into English:
Aphorisms, trans. by Miguel Gonzalez-Gerth (Pittsburgh: Latin American Literary Review Press, 1989)
Dalí, trans. by Nicholas Fry (New York: Park Lane, [1979])
Eight Novellas, trans. by Herlinda Charpentier Saitz and Robert L. Saitz (New York: Lang, 2005)
Greguerías: The Wit and Wisdom of Ramón Gómez de la Serna, trans. by Philip Ward (Cambridge: Oleander Press, 1982)
Movieland, trans. by Angel Flores (New York: Macaulay, 1930; new edition: Arlington, MA: Tough Poets Press, 2022)
Some Greguerías, trans. by Helen Granville-Barker (New York: [n. pub.] printed by Rudge's Sons, 1944)

References

Citations
 An earlier version of this article by Alan Hoyle first appeared in a special number ('Marginals and Megalomaniacs') of Aura: A Journal of the Avant-Garde, no. 3 (Summer 1995), 51–53,  ed. by Jeremy Stubbs and Andrew Hussey, and published in the Department of French, University of Manchester.

Further reading
Cardona, Rodolfo, RAMÓN: A Study of Gómez de la Serna and his Works (New York: Torres, 1957)
Dennis, Nigel, ed., Studies on Ramón Gómez de la Serna (Ottawa: Dovehouse, 1988)
Fernández-Medina, Nicolás. "Autobiography and the Task of the Writer: The Case of the Young Ramón Gómez de la Serna" ALEC 39.1 (2014): 61-82.
---. "Beyond the Boundaries of Interference: Ramón Gómez de la Serna and the Radio Revolution" Romance Notes 52.3 (2012): 301-309.
---. "La galería comercial de Ramón Gómez de la Serna en El hombre de la galería: modernidad y la experiencia urbana" Bulletin of Spanish Studies XC.7 (2013): 1105-1120.
---. "Writing the Self: What Gómez de la Serna Learned from Nietzsche" Revista Hispánica Moderna 62.1 (2009): 25-39.
---. "Tras el velo de las apariencias: La desmitificación del progreso en El caballero del hongo gris de Ramón Gómez de la Serna" Cincinnati Romance Review 32 (2011): 31-43.
---. "La 'Teoría del disparate' de Ramón y la experiencia del absurdo" BoletínRAMÓN 17 (2008): 3-9.
---. "Ramón Gómez de la Serna en Buenos Aires: Un vanguardista español en la ciudad más interesante y cortés de América" BoletínRAMÓN 10 (2005): 3-12.
Gardiol, Rita (Mazzetti), Ramón Gómez de la Serna (New York: Twayne, 1974)
Gonzalez-Gerth, Miguel, A Labyrinth of Imagery: Ramón Gómez de la Serna’s ‘novelas de la nebulosa’ (London: Tamesis, 1986)
Hoyle, Alan, El desafío de la incongruencia: la literatura de Ramón Gómez de la Serna (Madrid: Ediciones Clásicas/del Orto, 2010). 
McCulloch, John, The Dilemma of Modernity: Ramón Gómez de la Serna and the Spanish Modernist Novel (New York: Lang, 2007)
 
Thesis: Ramón Gómez de la Serna, by Ronald Daus, Professor at the Free University of Berlin 1970
Ramón Gómez de la Serna Papers , 1906–1967, SC.1967.04, Special Collections Department, University of Pittsburgh

External links

 The Ramón Gómez de la Serna Papers collection at the University of Pittsburgh
 Ramón Gómez de la Serna, hosts the internet journal BoletínRAMÓN

1888 births
1963 deaths
Spanish people of the Spanish Civil War (National faction)
Writers from Madrid
Spanish male dramatists and playwrights
20th-century Spanish dramatists and playwrights
20th-century Spanish male writers
Burials at Cementerio de San Justo